Bore or Bores often refer to:

Boredom
 Drill

Relating to holes
 Boring (manufacturing), a machining process that enlarges a hole
 Bore (engine), the diameter of a cylinder in a piston engine or a steam locomotive
 Bore (wind instruments), the interior chamber of a wind instrument
 Gauge (firearms), the inner diameter of the barrel of a firearm
 Nominal bore, a pipe size standard
 Water well, known as a bore in Australia

Places
 Bore (woreda), a district of Ethiopia that includes the town of Bore
 Bore, Emilia-Romagna, a commune in Emilia-Romagna, Italy
 Boré, Mali, a village in Dangol Boré commune in the Mopti Region of Mali
 Bore, Norway, a small village in Klepp municipality in Rogaland county, Norway
 Bore Track, a track in the South Australian outback
 Bore Valley, South Georgia, Antarctica

People
 Bore (surname)
 Francisco Bores (1898–1972), Spanish artist

Maritime shipping
 Steamship Company Bore, a Finnish company that operated for a time within Silja Line
 , a car-passenger ferry built in 1960
 SS Deneb, a cargo ship later renamed Bore VII

Other uses
 Bore War, a contemporary name for the Phoney War (1939–1940), an early phase of World War II
 Tidal bore, a type of tidal wave
 Undular bore, an atmospheric wave disturbance

See also
 Boar (disambiguation)
 Boer
 Bohr (disambiguation)
 Boor (disambiguation)
 Bored (disambiguation)
 Boredom (disambiguation)
 Boring (disambiguation)
 Drill (disambiguation)